The Thermal Valley is a valley located on the foothill of Yangmingshan National Park in Beitou District, Taipei, Taiwan. This makes Thermal Valley one of the sources of acidic sulfur hot spring in the area. Locals also sometimes refer to it as Hell Valley. The formula of this mineral water contains Plaster, Alunite, Jarosite, Realgar, Sulfur, and Radium. pH value is between 1.4~1.6, the highest temperature could be reached to 90 Celsius.  It was one of the eight attractions and twelve scenic spots in Taiwan during the Japanese colonial period.

Access
Thermal Valley is accessible within walking distance east from Xinbeitou Station of the Taipei Metro.

See also
 Beitou Hot Spring Museum
 Taiwanese hot springs

References

External links
The Malaymail on Line -  The 3 most popular side trips from Taipei
Taipei Times - Taipei’s hot spring area features unique type of spring

Valleys of Taiwan